was the ninth of ten s, and the third to be built for the Imperial Japanese Navy under the Circle Two Program (Maru Ni Keikaku).

History
Despite being one of the most powerful classes of destroyers in the world at the time of their completion, none survived the Pacific War.
Kawakaze, built at the Fujinagata Shipyards was laid down on 25 April 1935, launched on 1 November 1936 and commissioned on 30 April 1937.

Operational history
At the time of the attack on Pearl Harbor, Kawakaze was assigned to Destroyer Division 24 of Destroyer Squadron 4 of the IJN 2nd Fleet, and had sortied from Palau as part of the Philippine invasion force, covering landings at Legaspi and Lamon Bay. From January 1942, Kawakaze participated in operations in the Netherlands East Indies, including the invasions of Tarakan Island, Balikpapan and Makassar. After covering the invasion of Java, Kawakaze engaged a group of Allied destroyers during the Battle of the Java Sea, and was credited with assisting in the sinking of the American destroyer , and the British cruiser   and destroyer , rescuing 35 British survivors from both ships. In April, Kawakaze assisted in the invasion of Panay and Negros in the Philippines. From 10 May, Kawakaze was reassigned to the IJN 1st Fleet and returned to Sasebo Naval Arsenal for repairs at the end of the month.

During the Battle of Midway on 4–6 June, Kawakaze was part of the Aleutians Guard Force under Admiral Shirō Takasu, however, on 14 July she was assigned back to the IJN 2nd Fleet and returned to Truk in mid-August together with the aircraft carrier . On 21 August, while patrolling off of Guadalcanal, Kawakaze sunk the American destroyer . She participated in the Bombardment of Henderson Field on 24 August and was part of the escort for Japanese troop ships at the Battle of the Eastern Solomons. In the remainder of August through early November, Kawakaze participated in ten "Tokyo Express" high speed transport runs or surface attack missions to Guadalcanal, as well as participating briefly in the Battle of the Santa Cruz Islands on 26 October under Admiral Nobutake Kondō. During the First Naval Battle of Guadalcanal on the night of 12–13 November 1942, Kawakaze rescued 550 survivors from the torpedoed transport Brisbane Maru. For the rest of the month, Kawakaze patrolled between Shortland Island, Buna and Rabaul.

During the Battle of Tassafaronga on 30 November, torpedoes from Kawakaze possibly hit the American cruiser .

In December and through the end of January 1943, Kawakaze continued in transport operations to Guadalcanal and to Kolombangara, shifting to troop evacuation missions from Guadalcanal from February. 1 February 1943, while patrolling off Guadalcanal, she sunk motor torpedo boat PT-37.

On 9 February, she suffered significant damage in a collision with cargo ship Toun Maru and had to be towed by the destroyer  to Rabaul for emergency repairs, which allowed her to limp back to Sasebo by the end of March. Repairs completed by the end of May, Kawakaze returned to Truk, transported troops to Nauru in early June, and to Kwajalein in late June and Tuluvu on 1 August.

On 7 August 1943, Kawakaze was on a troop transport run to Kolombangara. Of her crew, 169 were killed, including her captain, Lieutenant Commander Yanase. She was removed from the navy list on 15 October 1943.

Notes

References

External links

LemaireSoft's Kawakaze
Kawakaze in Naval History of World Wars

Shiratsuyu-class destroyers
World War II destroyers of Japan
World War II shipwrecks in the Pacific Ocean
Shipwrecks in the Solomon Sea
1936 ships
Maritime incidents in August 1943
Ships built by Fujinagata Shipyards